The Shin-ei Companion FY-2 is a discontinued fuzz pedal, made by the Japanese Shin-ei effects pedal company from the late 1960s to the early 1970s. The pedal is known for its raw, distinctive, gated fuzz. FY-2 pedals are now rare.

Different versions were made, most using silicon transistors. These had a mid-cutting tone circuit, which lowered the volume. An earlier, rarer, version used germanium transistors. These did not have the tone circuit, and therefore had a louder output. The sound from this version is very rich, fluid and thick. 

The pedal has two knobs:
 "Volume" (controls overall level)
 "Fuzz" (tone)

FY-2 Users
Notable musicians who have used the FY-2 include:
Colin Greenwood of Radiohead, who used the pedal on "Exit Music (For a Film)" from the album OK Computer, and on "Myxomatosis" from Hail to the Thief.
 Graham Coxon
 Dan Auerbach
 Stephen Morris of Joy Division and New Order
 Ross Knight of Cosmic Psychos
 Nick Tyler of Driveblind
 Andrew Wilson of Die! Die! Die!
 Christian Bland of The Black Angels
 Ian Chestnutt of Percolator and Art Slug
 Kevin Bayly of The Dance Party
 William Reid of The Jesus and Mary Chain

External links
A guide to the FY-2
Discofreq's Effects Database entry for the FY-2, with modern clones and variations
New Order interview- Melody Maker 1986

Effects units